Jodi Kest (born March 30, 1962) is the former head women's basketball coach for the University of Akron.

Career
In her first season at Akron, the Zips posted double digit wins for the first time in more than eight years. That included a six-game winning streak, which was the longest in several years. Prior to coaching at Akron, she coached at Texas A&M University–Corpus Christi. She posted a 73–40 record there, and was named Independent Coach of the Year in 2003, 2004, and 2005. She announced her resignation from Akron on April 21, 2018 after 12 years at the school.

In the 2004 season, the Islanders went 23–7, setting school records for wins, and winning percentage. She also served as the head women's basketball coach at Gannon University in Pennsylvania for six seasons. She has a career record of 236–172 as a college head coach. She has also served as an assistant coach at the University of Maine, Cleveland State University, and the University of Nevada, Reno.

She graduated from Mayfield High School and Slippery Rock University of Pennsylvania.

Coaching Record

References

External links
Akron Zips coaching bio

1962 births
Living people
Akron Zips women's basketball coaches
American women's basketball coaches
Cleveland State Vikings women's basketball coaches
Slippery Rock University of Pennsylvania alumni
Texas A&M–Corpus Christi Islanders women's basketball coaches